Grafton was a British paperback imprint established 1981 by Granada Publishing Ltd, a subsidiary of media company Granada Group Ltd.  It was named after the publishing company's then address, 8 Grafton Street, in central London.  Other paperback imprints of Granada at the time included Paladin, later home of the Paladin Poetry Series, Panther and Mayflower. A collaboration with hardback publishers Jonathan Cape, Chatto and Windus and The Bodley Head in 1976 resulted in the creation of Triad Books.

In 1983 Granada Publishing Ltd was sold to the Glasgow-based publishers William Collins, Sons, which used the name Grafton to consolidate all of Granada's paperback imprints alongside its own existing Fontana imprint.

Collins was in turn bought by Rupert Murdoch's News Corporation in 1989 to create the HarperCollins publishing conglomerate.  The name Grafton disappeared as a separate brand c. 1993.

The Grafton imprint has no connection with the Grafton Books series of books on librarianship, bibliography and book collecting published by Andre Deutsch.

Authors 
They have published Michael Moorcock's books, among many others.

References
 Publisher:Grafton, Internet Speculative Fiction Database

Book publishing companies of the United Kingdom
Publishing companies established in the 1980s